The 1991 Skoda Czechoslovak Open was a men's tennis tournament played on Clay in Prague, Czech Republic that was part of the International Series of the 1991 ATP Tour.
Vojtěch Flégl and Daniel Vacek were the defending champions, but competed this year with different partners. Both players face esch other in the final, where Flégl (teaming up with Cyril Suk) defeated Vacek (teaming up with Libor Pimek), with a score of 6–4, 6–2.

Seeds

Draw

Draw

References

External links
 Official results archive (ATP)
 Official results archive (ITF)

Prague Open (1987–1999)
1991 ATP Tour